Piccadilly Restaurants  is an American chain of cafeteria-style, casual dining restaurants in seven, mainly southeastern United States with the majority located in the Gulf Coast region. They are owned by Piccadilly Holdings LLC.

In addition to its traditional restaurants, Piccadilly operates Piccadilly Emergency Services, which provides meals in emergency and disaster settings, and Piccadilly Food Service, which offers meals for schools, hospitals and government organizations.

The company also offers family dining, meals-to-go and catering services.

History

The first Piccadilly Cafeteria opened in 1932 in Baton Rouge, Louisiana. T.H. “Tandy” Hamilton acquired the business in 1944.

Piccadilly expanded in 1998 when it purchased Morrison’s Cafeterias, a major competitor. The move doubled the number of locations to 270, but poor performance led the company to file for bankruptcy in 2003. The company was then purchased by Yucaipa Companies and Diversified Investment Management Group.

Piccadilly filed again for Chapter 11 bankruptcy protection in 2012, as it was down to 41 locations. The company was purchased by Falcon Holdings, led by its former CEO Azam Malik, in 2014. In 2018, the company resumed its expansion, opening its first Piccadilly To-Go location in Cordova, Tennessee. In 2019 a "prototype" restaurant designed to lead future growth was opened at Juban Crossing in Denham Springs, LA, near the company's original location in Baton Rouge.

As of November 2022 there are 32 restaurants and over 80 food service locations under the brand name in Florida, Georgia, Louisiana, Mississippi, Tennessee, and Virginia.

On August 16, 2022, K&W Cafeterias president Dax Allred announced the sale of K&W and its 11 locations to Piccadilly.

References

Companies based in Baton Rouge, Louisiana
Economy of the Southeastern United States
Regional restaurant chains in the United States
Restaurants established in 1944
1944 establishments in Louisiana
Companies that filed for Chapter 11 bankruptcy in 2003
Companies that filed for Chapter 11 bankruptcy in 2012
Cafeteria-style restaurants